Chicoreus palmarosae (rose-branch murex)  is a species of predatory sea snail, a marine gastropod mollusk in the family Muricidae, the murex snails.

Description
The size of an adult shell varies between 65 mm and 130 mm.
It is mostly dark red with branch like structures all over the conch.

Distribution
This species occurs in the Indian Ocean along the Chagos Atoll and the Mascarene Basin; in the Pacific Ocean along Sri Lanka and Southwest Japan.

References

 Drivas, J. & M. Jay (1988). Coquillages de La Réunion et de l'île Maurice
 Schmidt, W. & O. Bellec (1994). Findings of some uncommon sea-shells off Madagascar. African Journal of Tropical Hydrobiology and Fisheries 5(1): 63 - 66.

External links 
 

Gastropods described in 1822
Taxa named by Jean-Baptiste Lamarck
Chicoreus